Dawn-Michelle Baude (born January 15, 1959) is an American poet, journalist and educator.

Biography
Born in southern Illinois, Baude moved to San Diego, California, in 1977 with her first husband Angelo Kolokithas (divorced 1979). Baude received her undergraduate degree from San Diego State University. While pursuing her graduate degree at New College of California, she was influenced by Robert Duncan and other Bay Area writers active in the 1980s. She received her MA from New College in 1986. She earned an MFA from Mills College shortly thereafter.

In the late 1980s, she moved to Athens, Greece, then to Paris, France, where she married Laurent Baude (divorced 2008). Influenced by the poets Alice Notley and Douglas Oliver, she published poetry as well as art criticism. She was a frequent contributor to various Condé Nast and Meredith publications, appearing with the bylines Dawn Kolokithas and Dawn-Michelle Baude, as well as under pseudonyms.

In the 1990s, she lived in Egypt, Lebanon and France. She gave birth to her son, Alexandre, in 1996—the same year she received her Diplôme d'études approfondies from the Sorbonne. She joined the faculty of Bard College's Lacoste School of the Arts program in southern France, during which time she met poet Gustaf Sobin, artist Curt Asker, composer Anders Hillborg, writer David Ambrose, filmmaker Peter Montagnon and other habitués of the Provence region.

She has taught at the Université de Paris, the American University of Beirut, Alexandria University (Egypt), John Cabot University (Rome, Italy), and the American University of Paris. She earned her PhD in English from the University of Illinois at Chicago in 2003. In 2007, after 18 years abroad, she returned to the US to make her home in the state of New York. In 2011, Baude moved to Las Vegas, Nevada, where she blogs for the Las Vegas Weekly, Huffington Post, and others.

Awards
 Tucson Festival of Books, First Place in Nonfiction, 2016
 Noepe Center for Literary Arts, Residency Scholarship, 2016
 Nevada Arts Council Artist Fellowship, Honorable Mention, 2016
 Senior Fulbright Award, 2005–06

Works

Poetry
Finally: A Calendar, Los Angeles, CA:  Mindmade Books, 2009
The Flying House, Anderson, SC: Free Verse/Parlor Press, 2008
Through a Membrane / Clouds, Bainbridge Island, WA: g o n g press, 2006
Egypt, Sausalito, CA: The Post-Apollo Press, 2003
Sunday, Paris, France: Signum Editions, 2002
The Beirut Poems, Austin, TX: Skanky Possum Editions, 2001
Gaffiot Exquis, Paris, France: Arkadin Press, 1997
Not Another Haiku, Berkeley, CA: Flit Publications, 1989
Good Morning, Bob, Berkeley, CA: Flit Publications, 1985

Poetry translations
A Vision of the Return by Amin Khan, Sausalito, CA: The Post-Apollo Press, 2012
End Papers by Bernard Picasso, Pace Wildenstein Gallery, New York, NY, 1998

Editorial
Van Gogh's Ear, an anthology of the arts, Paris, France: French Connection Press, 2009

Monographs and essays
Beckmann Retrospective: A Survey of Past and Present Works, Henderson, NV: Smacksheets, 2013
Everything is Perfect: The Art and Philosophy of Diego Jacobson, New York, NY: Ico Gallery, 2011
reConnaître: Curt Asker, Paris, France: Réunion des Musées Nationaux, 2001
Notes Toward a New Theory of Pasta, Berkeley, CA: Flit Publications, 1988

Communications
The Executive Guide to E-mail Correspondence, New York, NY: Career Press, 2009/07
The Everything Kids Learning French, New York, NY: Adams Media, 2008
Savoir Dire Non (with Marie Haddou), Paris, France: Flammarion, 2005/1997
The International Lawyer's Style Sheet, Paris, France: IBM EMEA, 2002

Nonfiction
Lane Lines, A Sampler, Paris, France: Cahier d’Acropole, 1992
Tropologue, Berkeley, CA: Poltroon Press, 1986
Letter From Africa, Bolinas, CA: Evergreen Press, 1984

Fiction
The Anatolian Tapestry, Berkeley, CA: Flit Publications, 1989
A Week In The Life Of The Marines, America's Most Elite Fighting Team, Berkeley, CA: Transitional Face, 1988

References

External links
"Dawn-Michelle Baude, Writer," Public Facebook Page
"Dawn-Michelle Baude" Official Website
"Mind in Vegas" Official Website
Works by and about Dawn-Michelle Baude in libraries (WorldCat catalogue)
Woodland Pattern biography

1959 births
Living people
San Diego State University alumni
New College of California alumni
University of Paris alumni
Mills College alumni
Academic staff of the American University of Beirut
Academic staff of the American University of Paris
Academic staff of John Cabot University
Academic staff of Alexandria University
Academic staff of the University of Paris
Poets from Illinois
American women poets
American women journalists
American expatriates in Lebanon
American expatriates in France
American women academics
21st-century American women